Lavínia is a municipality (município) in the state of São Paulo in Brazil. The population is 12,285 (2020 est.) in an area of 538 km2. The elevation is 458 m. The main activities are related to the production of coffee.

References

Municipalities in São Paulo (state)